Bukata may refer to several places:

Buq'ata, Golan Heights
Bukata, Bulgaria